Shinji Tatsuta (23 December 1914 – 1 January 1991) was a Japanese ski jumper. He competed in the individual event at the 1936 Winter Olympics.

References

External links
 

1914 births
1991 deaths
Japanese male ski jumpers
Olympic ski jumpers of Japan
Ski jumpers at the 1936 Winter Olympics
Sportspeople from Hokkaido